Everything Is Borrowed is the fourth studio album by English rapper and producer Mike Skinner, under the music project The Streets. Released in the United Kingdom on 15 September 2008, and in the United States on 7 October 2008, Skinner describes the album as a "peaceful coming to terms album" and as containing "peaceful positive vibes" which stand in stark contrast to the previous album, The Hardest Way to Make an Easy Living, which Skinner has described as a "guilt-ridden indulgence".

The album's eponymous first single, was released on 29 September 2008. In the months leading up to the album's release, "The Escapist" was offered online as a free download, accompanied by a music video. The video (directed by Ted Mayhem) follows Skinner as he walks 770 miles from Dover to a beach in France, a feat Skinner actually undertook. "Who Knows Who", a track Skinner recorded with the band Muse, was leaked in August 2008 and was initially believed by many to be a track from the upcoming album, until refuted by Muse.

During the recording of the album, Skinner states that he "threw away more music than is on the album now," as he was unhappy with the material recorded, but that "the album is a product of all the stuff I threw away, it was important to the album." Everything Is Borrowed is the penultimate album from The Streets; Skinner has said that he signed a five-record deal, and that he always envisioned a five-album box set. Eight music videos were made for the album, culminating with "On the Edge of a Cliff" being released on 7 April 2009 (videos were not made for "The Sherry End", "Alleged Legends" and "The Strongest Person I Know"). "On the Flip of a Coin" was used in the 2018/19 video game Life Is Strange 2.

Track listing
All tracks are written by Mike Skinner except 9 Mike Skinner & Tim Vigon
 "Everything Is Borrowed" – 4:04
 "Heaven for the Weather" – 3:27
 "I Love You More (Than You Like Me)" – 3:45
 "The Way of the Dodo" – 3:33
 "On the Flip of a Coin" – 3:21
 "On the Edge of a Cliff" – 3:04
 "Never Give In" – 3:25
 "The Sherry End" – 2:46
 "Alleged Legends" – 3:12
 "The Strongest Person I Know" – 3:03
 "The Escapist" – 5:16
 "To Your Face" (iTunes bonus track) – 3:35

Personnel

The Streets
 Mike Skinner – vocals, guitar (tracks 2, 4, 7), xylophone (track 2), bass (track 4), drums (track 4), keyboards (tracks 4, 7), bells (track 11)
 Johnny "Drummachine" Jenkins – bass (tracks 1, 7), drums (tracks 1, 2, 3, 5, 6, 7, 9, 11), percussion (tracks 1, 2, 3, 5, 6, 9, 11), glockenspiel (track 1), acoustic guitar (tracks 1, 5, 6), piano (track 2), vocals (track 6), electric guitar (tracks 10, 11), recorder (track 10), triangle (track 10), xylophone (track 10)
 Kevin Mark Trail – vocals (track 11)
 Wayne Bennett – bass (tracks 5, 6), electric guitar (tracks 5, 6)
 Chris Brown – keyboards (track 2), hammond organ (tracks 2, 6, 9), rhodes (track 5), accordion (tracks 5, 9), wurlitzer (track 6)
 Eddie Jenkins – rhodes (track 3), piano (tracks 3, 6, 10)
 Laura Vane – vocals (tracks 1, 5, 6, 10)

Additional Musicians
 dirty pretty strings - string quartet (tracks 1, 11)
 Andy Love – vocals (track 1)
 Barnet Philharmonic Choir – backing vocals (track 2)
 Bob Dowell – Piano (track 2)
 Richard Wayler – vocals (track 2)
 Nick Marshall – guitar (track 2)
 Camilla Pay – harp (tracks 3, 5, 6, 10)
 Chris williams – flute (tracks 3, 9), whistle (track 3)
 Nick Marshall – double bass (track 3), acoustic guitar (track 10)
 Teddy Mitchell – backing vocals (tracks 3, 5), whistle (track 3)
 Gita Harcourt – violin (tracks 5, 6, 9)
 David Gino Jenkins – vocals (track 6)
 Jake Painter – trumpet (tracks 6, 9)
 Maria Payne – clarinet (tracks 6, 9, 10)
 Ed Harcourt – banjo (track 9), mandolin (track 10)

Charts

Certifications

References

2008 albums
679 Artists albums
Albums produced by Mike Skinner (musician)
The Streets albums